Quasitrilaminopora is a genus of early Eocene bryozoans of the family Arachnopusiidae, discovered in Chatham Island, New Zealand.

References

Prehistoric bryozoan genera
Cheilostomatida